Filipinos in Thailand are either migrants or descendants of migrants from the Philippines. They are most likely married with Thais and settle in Thailand for many years. Nowadays, more Filipinos going to Thailand to work as overseas Filipino workers. Most of them are working as English teachers. There are many Filipino community groups and associations.

Notable people
 Christina Aguilar, Thai singer (father is Spanish-Filipino and mother is Franco-Vietnamese)
 Robert Joseph Cespedes, also known as Toon Hiranyasap, Thai actor (father is Spanish-Filipino)
 Johnny Anfone, Thai actor (father is Filipino and Thai-German mother)
 Billy Mittakarin Ogan, Thai actor and Thai singer (father is Filipino and mother is Thai)
 Milagros Atienza Jimena, also known as Maliwan Jimena, Thai singer (Filipino parents)
 Oranate D. Caballes, Thai actress and Thai badminton players. (father is Filipino and mother is Lahu)
 Wipawee D. Caballes, Thai downhill mountain biker (father is Filipino and mother is Thai)

See also

 Philippines–Thailand relations

References

Thailand
Thailand
 
Ethnic groups in Thailand